Dendrobium lasioglossum is a species of orchid endemic to New Guinea.

References

lasioglossum
Orchids of New Guinea
Endemic flora of New Guinea
Plants described in 1868